Golla Babu Rao (born 10 August 1954) is an Indian politician and a former APPSC Group- I officer who is the current Member of Legislative of assembly of Payakaraopeta, Andhra Pradesh since May 2019, from the YSR Congress Party, under Shri. Y.S. Jagan Mohan Reddy, which won the 2019 AP Assembly elections with a historic majority, obtaining 151 seats out of 175 seats. Before entering politics, Babu Rao had worked as a Joint Commissioner of Panchayat Raj and Rural Development in Hyderabad, Telangana. Babu Rao is a Post Graduate in Economics, along with having an LLB Degree.

Personal life

Babu Rao was born to Golla Satyam and Golla Sayamma on 10 September 1954, in Kovvali, Denduluru Mandal, Andhra Pradesh. He went on to finish his Elementary school from the Salvation Army Elementary School and thereafter his matriculation from the Zilla Parishad High School, both in Kovvali. He attended Sir C.R. Reddy College, for his Intermediate and B.Com., in Eluru. Further, he went on to pursue a Post Graduate Degree in Economics from the D.N. Jain college, Jabalpur University, Madhya Pradesh. He also has an LLB Degree from the Osmania University, Hyderabad. He married Vasantha Kumari on 24 January 1988 and has two children – a son and a daughter.

Career

Golla Babu Rao began his professional career in the Group-I services in 1986, AP, as a District Panchayat Officer. He then worked as District Panchayat Officer, Khammam up to 1991. He has worked in Visakhapatnam from 1991 to 1993 as chief executive officer SETWIN, Visakhapatnam, Employment Generation and Youth Service. He was then promoted as the Deputy Development Officer and posted to Zilla Parishad, Visakhapatnam from 1993 to 1994. From 1994 to 1995, he was promoted again as a chief executive officer and posted to Zilla Parishad, Cuddapah. He was then posted in Visakhapatnam from 1995 to 1997 as CEO ZP. He also worked at East Godavari from 1997 to 2002 as CEO, Zilla Parishad. He was again posted as the CEO, Zilla Parishad, Visakhapatnam from 2002 to February 2004. And till his voluntary retirement in 2009, he worked as the Joint Commissioner of Panchayat Raj in Hyderabad.

Political life

As an ardent follower of Shri. Late YS Rajasekhara Reddy, Babu Rao began his political career, in 2009, as a member of the AP Legislative Assembly from Payakaraopeta, a reserved constituency in Visakhapatnam district. Golla Babu Rao also lost one of his close friends, Dr. P. Subramanyam, a 1983 batch IAS officer, in the same helicopter crash with the late Chief Minister YSR.

As an MLA, he was part of implementing many schemes of the State Government. He also worked towards drinking water projects. Attempts are being made to prepare design for strong embankments on the Varaha river. As promised by the honorable chief minister, Shri Jagan Mohan Reddy, steps are being taken to revive Thandava and Etikoppaka Cooperative Sugar Factories in the district. A government college was sanctioned for Payakaraopeta under Babu Rao's tenure.

References

1954 births
Living people